Law enforcement in North Macedonia is the responsibility of the Police of the Republic of North Macedonia (Policija na Republika Severna Makedonija).

The police headquarters are located in Skopje at the Ministry of Internal Affairs, and also maintain an air base in nearby Idrizovo. Taiwan, Canada, and Italy have all contributed Bell Helicopter Textron helicopters to the police force's Macedonian Police Aviation Unit in cooperation with the Air Force of North Macedonia to help combat insurgencies the country.

The law enforcement agencies of North Macedonia are regulated by the Constitution of 1991, the Law on Internal Affairs of 1995, the Criminal Procedure Code of 1997 and the Draft Law on Changes and Additions to the Criminal Procedure Code. With police actions and behavior controlled by the Criminal Procedure Code, and the Law on Internal Affairs controlling the use of firearms by the police force. On July 1, 2003 the Law on the Police Academy was enacted, creating a police academy to train civil and border police officers.

The force has been the subject of a number of recent reforms regarding both the Albanian insurgency, and possible violations of human rights, with NATO officials stating that the force was "not really up to European standards" as policemen lacked in skills and weapons.

History
The Police were subject to scrutiny during Albanian riots on 9 July 1997 when protesters collected in the western town of Gostivar. Over 200 were wounded and three killed (two shot, one beaten to death)
in a resulting clash with police riot squads, and the Humans Rights Watch investigated allegations of police brutality. 
These events underlined a continuing friction between the Macedonian Police force and Albanians living in North Macedonia. The International Helsinki Federation for Human Rights reported that police abuse of suspects, particularly during initial arrest and detention, and police harassment of ethnic minorities is ongoing.

The Police of North Macedonia work closely with the NATO peacekeepers in patrolling areas with high numbers of ethnic Albanians ever since the 2001 Macedonia conflict ended, and have been receiving weapons from surrendering Albanian insurgents. Violent attacks, however, still occur as in 2001 three officers were killed by Albanian gunmen.

A Notable Incident was when the Macedonian Police arrested a Horse in 2009 used by a crime smuggling ring to smuggle Air conditioners from Serbia. At that time the Police were not sure whether to press charges or not, but ultimately decided to not press charges against the Horse.

On the 2nd of December, 2022, during a routine traffic stop, а driver was asked to show his documents, to which the driver didn't comply and proceeded to call an Armed group. Said group proceeded to chase the Police officers out of Aračinovo and into the Gazi Baba police station.

Organization
 Border Police
 Lake Patrol Police
 Traffic Police
 Helicopter unit

Special Police
 Special Operations Unit - Tigers
 Rapid Deployment Unit
 Special Support Unit
 Unit for First Response and Intervention - Alpha

Former
 Lions

Equipment

Vehicles

Former Vehicles

Dogs

Small Arms

Gallery

See also 

 Intelligence Agency Domestic intelligence agency
 Administration for Security and Counterintelligence Foreign intelligence agency
Military Service for Security and Intelligence-G2 Military intelligence agency

References

Law enforcement in the Republic of Macedonia